Yun Seondo (1587–1671), also spelled as Yoon Sun-Do, was a Korean philosopher, poet, and politician. A Neo-Confucian scholar, he was also known by his pen names Gosan and Haeong.

Life 
He was born in Seoul, in what is now South Korea. He achieved early success as a government official, but his straightforward character made enemies at court and he was banished for imprudent criticism of those in power. Thirteen years later he returned to become tutor to the royal princes but was later banished again. He spent most of his 85 years in his rustic country home, contemplating the nature of life, teaching and writing poetry.

Yun is considered the greatest master of the sijo form in Korean literature. His most famous composition is The Fisherman's Calendar a cycle of forty seasonal sijo. 
In both Chinese and Korean classical poetry, the fisherman symbolized a wise man who lives simply and naturally. In art, the fisherman appeared almost invariably in one of the most common genres of Asian water colors: sets of four paintings, one for each season of the year.

Yun Seondo wove both traditions into The Fisherman's Calendar. It is the longest and most ambitious sijo cycle attempted during the classical period of his life.

Works 
 Gosan seonsaeng yugo (고산선생유고, 孤山先生遺稿)
 Byeoljip (별집, 別集)
 Yakhwaje (약화제, 藥和劑)
 Cheobangjeonseonchangyak (처방전선창약, 癬瘡藥)
 Hoechungyak (회충약, 蛔蟲藥)
 Haesuyak (해수약, 咳嗽藥)
 Bokhaksinbang (복학신방, 腹학神方)
 Uyeoksinbang (우역신방, 牛疫神方)
 Oseonjubang (오선주방, 五仙酒方)

See also
List of Korean-language poets
Korean literature
List of Koreans
Heo Mok
Jeong gu
Yun Hyu
Song Siyeol
Song Jungil
Yun Du-seo
Bogildo Yun Seondo garden

References

External links
The Fisherman's Calendar
 General information about Yun Seondo from Haenam Culture & Tourism
 Brief information about Yun Seondo and sightseeing around Haenam-si from Haenam Culture & Tourism
 Goshan Yun Seondo's memorial museum

1587 births
1671 deaths
17th-century Korean philosophers
17th-century Korean poets
Joseon scholar-officials
Korean male poets